Dogwood Point is the southernmost point of Saint Kitts and Nevis. It is located in the southwest of the island of Nevis. There is a light on the point. The point is approximately 2.7 miles SSE of Fort Charles.

References 

Landforms of Saint Kitts and Nevis